Vahid Bahreh Bardari Lab Sefid (also Romanized as Vāḥid Bahreh Bardārī Lab Sefīd) is a village in Shahi Rural District, Sardasht District, Dezful County, Khuzestan Province, Iran. At the 2006 census, its population was 122, in 31 families.

References 

Populated places in Dezful County